Southern Lord Records is an American independent record label founded by Greg Anderson in 1998. The Los Angeles-based label was initially formed "just to put out" the debut albums by Thorr's Hammer and Burning Witch. These bands were among the first collaborations between Anderson and Stephen O'Malley, who also formed Sunn O))), one of the label's biggest selling acts along with Japanese band Boris.

The underground label also found bigger sales with releases by side projects of mainstream artists, such as Dave Grohl's Probot and Josh Homme's The Desert Sessions, volumes 7 & 8. Southern Lord's discography is diverse, and consists of albums by experimental metal bands Earth, Goatsnake and Khanate, as well as releases from black metal acts like Wolves in the Throne Room and Striborg.

Catalog 
This list is organized by catalog number, a roughly chronological number system established by the label and typically printed on or assigned to each official release. However, unlike many record labels with similar systems, smaller releases such as singles, split albums, and co-releases with other labels have often been assigned a catalog number using a decimal.

"—" denotes unassigned catalog numbers.

References 
General

 Note: User must navigate to Pop > Label, and enter "Southern Lord" in text box. Select first search result.

Specific

External links

Southern Lord Records discography at Rate Your Music

Discographies of American record labels

Heavy metal discographies